Tydd railway station was a station, opened by the Peterborough, Wisbech and Sutton Bridge Railway on 1 August 1866, in Lincolnshire serving the villages of Tydd St Mary, Tydd Gote and Tydd St Giles, Cambridgeshire on the Midland and Great Northern Joint Railway route between Sutton Bridge and Wisbech. It closed on 2 March 1959.

References

External links
 Tydd station on navigable 1946 O. S. map

Disused railway stations in Lincolnshire
Former Midland and Great Northern Joint Railway stations
Railway stations in Great Britain opened in 1866
Railway stations in Great Britain closed in 1959
1866 establishments in England
1959 disestablishments in England